Raci or RACI may refer to:

 Raci (ethnonym), or Rascians, a name used to designate Serbs in the Middle Ages and early modern times
 Raci Şaşmaz, Turkish producer, writer and actor
 Raci, a village in Negomir Commune, Gorj County, Romania
 Royal Australian Chemical Institute, the qualifying body in Australia for professional chemists and a learned society promoting the science and practice of chemistry in all its branches
 RACI matrix, a diagram which is used to describe the four key roles (responsible, accountable, consulted, and informed) in project tasks or deliverables

See also
 Raji (disambiguation)

Turkish masculine given names